The Manuel de Codage, abbreviated MdC, is a standard system for the computer-encoding of transliterations of Egyptian hieroglyphic texts.

History
In 1984 a committee was charged with the task to develop a uniform system for the encoding of hieroglyphic texts on the computer. The resulting Manual for the Encoding of Hieroglyphic Texts for Computer-input (Jan Buurman, Nicolas Grimal, Jochen Hallof, Michael Hainsworth and Dirk van der Plas, Informatique et Egyptologie 2, Paris 1988) is generally shortened to Manuel de Codage. It presents an easy to use way of encoding hieroglyphic writing as well as the abbreviated hieroglyphic transliteration. The encoding system of the Manuel de Codage has since been adopted by international Egyptology as the official common standard for registering hieroglyphic texts on the computer.

Egyptologists have scheduled a revision for 2007 of the Manuel de Codage, in order to ensure broader implementation in current and future software.

List of Gardiner's fundamental uniliteral hieroglyphs and their transliteration

The MdC specifies a method for electronically encoding complete ancient Egyptian texts, indicating many of the features characterizing hieroglyphic writing such as the placement, orientation, colour, and even size of individual hieroglyphs. Hieroglyphs not included in the list of fundamentals are referred to by their Gardiner number. This system is used (though frequently with modifications) by various software packages developed for typesetting hieroglyphic texts (such as SignWriter, WinGlyph, MacScribe, InScribe, Glyphotext, WikiHiero, and others). It is loosely based on the common representation of algebraic formulae. Some of the rules are:
 the "-"-sign concatenates the signs or group of signs between which it is placed.
 the ":"-sign places the first sign or group of signs above the second sign
 the "*"-sign juxtaposes two signs or groups of signs
 the rounded brackets "( )" form a compact grouping of signs arranged according to the other rules, which is treated as if it were a single sign
 the "< >"-brackets mark cartouches
 the "!"-sign marks an end of line
 the "!!"-sign marks an end of page

Examples
 The name Amenhotep, in hieroglyphs i-mn:n-R4:t*p, would be transliterated thus: i-mn:n-R4:t*p, where mn stands for mn and R4 is the Gardiner number for the Htp hieroglyph. Instead of writing R4, one could use Htp, but not all signs in the Gardiner list can be transliterated in such a way, as there are many hieroglyphs transliterated with the same Latin character in the case of uniliterals and characters in the case of bi- and triliterals. The most frequently used hieroglyph was chosen to be represented by a certain letter or letter combination. Thus n stands for  n rather than for S3, which phonetically is represented with n as well.
 In order to add a cartouche, as seen in  < i-mn:n-R4:t*p > , one would write < i-mn:n-R4:t*p > or < i-mn:n-:t*p >

See also
Gardiner's sign list of hieroglyphs

Notes

References
 Jan Buurman, Inventaire des signes hiéroglyphiques en vue de leur saisie informatique,  Impr. Lienhart 1988; Diffusion de Boccard

External links
Manuel de Codage: A standard system for the computer-encoding of Egyptian transliteration and hieroglyphic texts

Egyptian hieroglyphs
Transliteration